Melaleuca pyramidalis is a plant in the myrtle family, Myrtaceae and is endemic to small areas of Queensland in Australia. (Some Australian state herbaria use the name Callistemon pyramidalis.) It is closely related to Melaleuca citrina (Callistemon citrinus) but is distinguished from it mainly by leaf and stamen differences. Melaleuca pyramidalis is only known from the summits of three mountains in Queensland.

Description
The veins are pinnate and there are only a few scattered, indistinct oil glands.

M. pyramidalis can be distinguished from the similar M. citrina by its obscure oil glands (prominent in M. citrina) and yellow stamen tips (dark red in M.citrina).

Taxonomy and naming
Melaleuca pyramidalis was first formally described in 2009 by Lyndley Craven in Novon from a specimen collected at the summit of Walshs Pyramid near Gordonvale. In 2012, Udovicic and Spencer gave the species the name Callistemon pyramidalis but in 2013, Craven transferred all species previously known as Callistemon to Melaleuca. Some authorities continue to use Callistemon pyramidalis. The specific epithet (pyramidalis) refers to Walshs Pyramid where the type specimen was collected.

Callistemon pyramidalis is regarded as a synonym of Melaleuca pyramidalis by the Royal Botanic Gardens, Kew.

Distribution and habitat
Melaleuca pyramidalis occurs on the summits of Walshs Pyramid, Mount Diamantina (on Hinchinbrook Island) and Mount Leach (near Ingham). It grows mostly in open forest on rocky hilltops.

Conservation
The classification "Vulnerable" under the IUCN Red List applies to Melaleuca pyramidalis because it is only known from a few sites.

References

pyramidalis
Flora of Queensland
Plants described in 2009
Taxa named by Lyndley Craven